Joseph Victor Gomez Ejercito (born December 26, 1969), also known as JV Ejercito Estrada or simply JV Ejercito, is a Filipino politician and businessman serving as a Senator since 2022 and previously from 2013 to 2019. He had also served as the representative of San Juan from 2010 to 2013 and was the city's mayor from 2001 to 2010. He is a son of former president Joseph Estrada, and a half-brother of Senator Jinggoy Estrada.

Ejercito credits himself as the author of the Universal Health Care Act of the Philippines.

Early life
Joseph Victor "JV" G. Ejercito was born December 26, 1969, in Manila to actor Joseph Ejercito Estrada, the then Mayor-elect of San Juan (then a municipality of Rizal), and businesswoman and fellow celebrity Guia Gomez.

Education
He attended Xavier School for his primary and secondary education and completed his Bachelor of Arts in Political Science at the De La Salle University.

Political career

San Juan mayor
On February 27, 2001, Ejercito filed his candidacy to run for mayor of San Juan. Despite his father's removal from office as President of the Philippines due to the Second EDSA Revolution a month prior, Ejercito stated that in San Juan, "there is still a strong clamor for me to run." He eventually served as mayor for three consecutive terms from 2001 to 2010. He was succeeded by his mother Guia Gomez.

House of Representatives
During the 2010 elections, Ejercito ran for the position of representative for the lone district of San Juan. Over the course of his term, Ejercito authored and/or sponsored 161 bills and/or House measures, five of which were approved by the House and passed to the Senate for consideration:

HB 4225: Participatory Governance Through CSOs Empowerment Act of 2011
HB 4541: Mercury Exposure Information Act of 2011
HB 4565: Local Housing Boards Act
HB 5870: Cadastral Survey Act of 2012
HB 6144: Domestic Workers Act of 2012 or Kasambahay Bill

Senate

On October 1, 2012, Ejercito filed his certificate of candidacy for the 2013 Philippine Senate election, where he won as the 11th placer out of 12 winning senators elected.

During his six years in the Senate, Ejercito filed a total of 140 bills and resolutions. Ejercito also chaired the Senate Committee on Economic Affairs and the Committee on Urban Planning, Housing and Resettlement and the Health and the Demography Committee in the 17th Congress.

On April 6, 2016, Sandiganbayan Fifth Division issued an arrest warrant against Ejercito and four other government officials, in connection with allegations on misuse of funds during his term as San Juan mayor. However,  Ejercito was cleared of the charges because the case was dismissed.

Ejercito ran and launched a campaign to secure a second consecutive term in the 2019 Philippine Senate election, his candidacy was endorsed by President Rodrigo Duterte. His half-brother, former Senator Jinggoy, who was previously jailed and charged with multiple counts of plunder in 2014, also sought a Senate return. During the campaign, the siblings had a disagreement in the idea of them running at the same time, Ejercito expressed that Estrada running would "ruin his chances", he also threw shade against Estrada as he referred himself as "The Good One" in political ads.  Eventually, the half-siblings both lost as Ejercito ended up in 13th place, just a spot outside the winning circle, while Estrada finished at 15th place. After conceding defeat, Estrada wished that Senator Nancy Binay would make it over Ejercito, with both senators vying for the last spot in the partial and unofficial count, Ejercito responded by telling Estrada that he placed 13th in his own hometown, “Let him speak... It’s painful to accept that even in your own bailiwick you are unwanted,".

Ejercito sought for a comeback to the Senate in 2022 and won as the 10th placer, earning his second nonconsecutive term. His half-brother Jinggoy Estrada was also successful as he placed 12th. Ejercito is the current Chairman of the Senate Committee on Local Government and the Senate Committee on Urban Planning, Housing and Resettlement.

Personal life
He is married to Hyacinth "Cindy" Lotuaco with whom he has a son, Julio Jose. He also has an older son, Jose Emilio. Joseph Victor is also a Commissioned Reserve Officer of the Philippine Marine Corps with the rank of Major. He is an adopted member of the Philippine Military Academy Class of '88, Maringal.

Ejercito has a tattoo on his right arm: A red eight-rayed sun with the baybayin character for ka at the center, and the phrase Para sa Bayan ("For the country") and the letter "K" on top of the sun. He has also raced in the Toyota Vios Cup. He is also an avid cyclist, having received attention for biking from his residence in San Juan to the Senate building in Pasay, and for an incident where he fell off his bike after tripping on a pothole along Roxas Boulevard a year prior.

References

1969 births
Living people
Children of presidents of the Philippines
De La Salle University alumni
JV
JV
Mayors of San Juan, Metro Manila
Members of the House of Representatives of the Philippines from San Juan, Metro Manila
Nationalist People's Coalition politicians
People from San Juan, Metro Manila
People from Manila
Pwersa ng Masang Pilipino politicians
Senators of the 16th Congress of the Philippines
Senators of the 17th Congress of the Philippines
Senators of the 19th Congress of the Philippines
United Nationalist Alliance politicians